The Macleay Argus is an English-language newspaper published twice a week, on Tuesday and Friday, in Kempsey, New South Wales, Australia. In 1952 it absorbed The Macleay Chronicle, which had been in publication since 1878.

History 
The Macleay Argus commenced publication in 1885. Its circulation included the Hastings, Manning, Camden Haven, Rollands Plains, Upper Macleay and the Northern Coast districts.

The Macleay Chronicle was published in Kempsey from 1878-1952. In 1892 it circulated to 1500 people in the district. From 1910 it was published by Edward Patrick Noonan, whose son Harry also worked for the paper. After Edward's death, the Chronicle was run by his three daughters Ethel Margaret, Dorothy and Vivienne until 1952. The paper was then absorbed by the Macleay Argus.

Digitisation 
Both The Macleay Argus and The Macleay Chronicle have been digitised as part of the Australian Newspapers Digitisation Program of the National Library of Australia.

See also 
 List of newspapers in Australia
 List of newspapers in New South Wales

References

External links 
 Macleay Argus
 
 

Newspapers published in New South Wales
Publications established in 1885
Newspapers on Trove